Dwarapudi is an Indian Railways station in Dwarapudi, a town in East Godavari district of Andhra Pradesh. It lies on the Vijayawada–Chennai section and is administered under Vijayawada railway division of South Central Railway zone.

History
The southern part of the East Coast State Railway (from Waltair to Vijayawada) was taken over by Madras Railway in 1901.

Classification 
In terms of earnings and outward passengers handled, Dwarapudi is categorized as a Non-Suburban Grade-5 (NSG-5) railway station. Based on the re–categorization of Indian Railway stations for the period of 2017–18 and 2022–23, an NSG–5 category station earns between – crore and handles  passengers.

Station amenities 

It is one of the 38 stations in the division to be equipped with Automatic Ticket Vending Machines (ATVMs).

References 

 Dwarapudi Solar Power(Energy Neutral) Station Under Vijayawada Division

External links 

Railway stations in East Godavari district
Vijayawada railway division